Turning Technologies is an education technology company with a headquarters in Youngstown, Ohio, and additional offices in Scottsdale, Arizona, and Belfast. Turning Technologies serves educational, corporate, government and military markets.

Turning Technologies History 
Turning Technologies was founded by former CEO Mike Broderick in 2002 as a member of the Youngstown Business Incubator. Starting with just three employees, the company soon expanded and, in 2007, was ranked among the seven fastest-growing small businesses in the nation by Entrepreneur magazine, and was named the fastest growing privately held software company in the U.S. by Inc. Magazine. In 2008, the company moved from the business incubator to the Taft Technology Center in order to accommodate an increase in employees.

In 2013, Turning Technologies acquired eInstruction, one of its biggest competitors in the education technology market. As part of the eInstruction purchase, Turning Technologies also acquired GTCO CalComp.

When Broderick retired in 2016, then-Chief Operating Officer and Chief Technology Officer Ethan Cohen took over as CEO. The current CEO, Kenneth Frank, stepped into the position in June 2019 and served until his resignation in June 2021.

Company 
The company was headed by Chief Executive Officer Kenneth Frank until June 2, 2021 when he resigned. Although Turning Technologies continues to sell hardware products, including whiteboards and clickers, it operates primarily on a software-as-a-service (SaaS) model.

Products 
Turning Technologies offers software including TurningPoint audience response system and ExamView; response options including hardware clickers and a mobile app; and interactive whiteboards.

References

External links
 TurningTechnologies.com

Electronics companies established in 1975
Computer peripheral companies
1975 establishments in Maryland